Thomas Edward Hassan is an American educator who served as the first gentleman of New Hampshire from 2013 to 2017 as the husband of governor Maggie Hassan. He has served as the President of School Year Abroad since June 2016. Previously, he worked at Phillips Exeter Academy, where he began as the Director of College Counseling in 1989, worked as the Dean of Admissions, and was the 14th principal from 2009 until his retirement from the school in 2015. In 2016, Hassan was censured by The Association of Boarding Schools for failing to disclose sexual misconduct of a former teacher at Phillips Exeter.  During his 20 years at Exeter, Hassan taught mathematics and junior studies, served as dorm affiliate, and advised student organizations, including Best Buddies and the Random Acts of Kindness club.

Hassan earned a bachelor of arts degree at Brown University, Providence, Rhode Island, and earned master's and doctoral degrees in Education at Harvard University, Cambridge, Massachusetts. In 2011, The New York Observer named Hassan as one of 24 "Elite Private School Power Players".

References

External links
 Phillips Exeter Academy
 Kentucky Derby fundraiser aids scholarships

1958 births
Living people
Brown University alumni
Phillips Exeter Academy faculty
First Ladies and Gentlemen of New Hampshire
People from Exeter, New Hampshire
Harvard Graduate School of Education alumni
American school principals